

References

Parks and open spaces in Hertfordshire
Sports venues in Hertfordshire
Hertfordshire
Lists of buildings and structures in Hertfordshire